Warren Peak is a high rock peak southeast of Halle Flat in the Allan Hills, Oates Land. Reconnoitered by the New Zealand Antarctic Research Program (NZARP) Allan Hills Expedition, 1964. They named it after Guyon Warren, from whose initiative the expedition was conceived and organized, but who only participated in the expedition for part of the time because of an accident.

Mountains of Oates Land